Edward or Ed Wood may refer to:

Edward Wood (MP) (fl. 1584–86), English politician
Sir Edward Wood (diplomat), British envoy to Sweden in the 1670s
Edward Wood (British Army officer) (1841–1898)
Ed Wood (1924–1978), American filmmaker
Ed Wood (film), a 1994 film based on the life of the filmmaker
E. F. L. Wood, 1st Earl of Halifax, full name Edward Frederick Lindley Wood (1881–1959)
Edward J. Wood (1866–1956), leader of The Church of Jesus Christ of Latter-day Saints in Alberta, Canada
Edward Allan Wood (1872–1930), British Army officer
Edward Rogers Wood (1866–1941), financier in Canadian business
Edward Wood (priest), Archdeacon of Mashonaland, 1946–1960
Edward John Wood, footballer known as Jackie Wood
Ed Wood (engineer) (born 1968), former chief designer for the Williams Formula One team
Ed Wood (elm cultivar), a Chinese elm cultivar

See also
Edward Woods (disambiguation)